Patrick Viot (25 May 1952 – 16 March 2021) was a French footballer. He played as a goalkeeper for US Orléans from 1980 to 1991, helping them reach the Coupe de France final in 1980.

Biography
He then continued his amateur career with US Orléans, becoming professional in 1980. In his first professional year, he helped his team reach the final of the Coupe de France. During the match, a controversial penalty kick caused AS Monaco to take a 2–1 lead, and ultimately won the game 3–1. He played in 240 matches for Orléans, retiring in 1991. He then worked as a mechanic in Saran alongside his friend, Joël Mauger. Their shop was called "Mauger Viot".

Patrick Viot died in Orléans on 16 March 2021 at the age of 68.

References

1952 births
2021 deaths
French footballers
Association football goalkeepers
US Orléans players